Mihai Daniel Leca (born 14 April 1992) is a Romanian professional footballer who plays as a centre back.

Honours

Club

TNS
Welsh Premier League: 2016–17

Chindia Târgoviște
Liga II: 2018–19

References

External links
 
 

1992 births
Living people
Footballers from Bucharest
Romanian footballers
Association football defenders
Romania youth international footballers
Romania under-21 international footballers
FC Steaua București players
Liga I players
Liga II players
Cymru Premier players
Moldovan Super Liga players
Ukrainian Premier League players
CS Concordia Chiajna players
ASC Oțelul Galați players
Zakho FC players
FC Brașov (1936) players
The New Saints F.C. players
FC Zimbru Chișinău players
ASC Daco-Getica București players
AFC Chindia Târgoviște players
FC Argeș Pitești players
FC Lviv players
Romanian expatriate footballers
Romanian expatriate sportspeople in Iraq
Expatriate footballers in Iraq
Romanian expatriate sportspeople in Wales
Expatriate footballers in Wales
Romanian expatriate sportspeople in Moldova
Expatriate footballers in Moldova
Romanian expatriate sportspeople in Ukraine
Expatriate footballers in Ukraine